Colorado's 25th Senate district is one of 35 districts in the Colorado Senate. It has been represented by Democrat Faith Winter since 2023. Prior to redistricting the district was represented by Democrats Kevin Priola (who was elected twice as a Republican before switching parties) and Mary Hodge.

Geography
District 25 is based in eastern Adams County in the suburbs of Denver, including parts of Thornton, Brighton, Bennett, Todd Creek, Strasburg, and the northern reaches of Aurora.

The district overlaps with Colorado's 4th, 6th, and 7th congressional districts, and with the 30th, 31st, 34th, and 56th districts of the Colorado House of Representatives.

Recent election results
Colorado state senators are elected to staggered four-year terms. The old 25th district held elections in presidential years, but the new district drawn following the 2020 Census will hold elections in midterm years, starting in 2022.

2022
The 2022 election will be the first one held under the state's new district lines. Incumbent Republican Senator Kevin Priola was redistricted to the 13th district, which won't be up until 2024. In 2022, Democratic 24th district Senator Faith Winter is running for the 25th district instead, against Republican Melody Peotter and Libertarian Jeremiah Johnson.

Historical election results

2020

2016

2012

Federal and statewide results in District 25

References 

25
Adams County, Colorado